Banda District is one of the twelve districts in Bono Region, Ghana. Originally it was formerly part of the then-larger Tain District on 17 February 2004; until the northern part of the district was split off to create Banda District on 28 June 2012; thus the remaining part has been retained as Tain District. The district assembly is located in the northeast part of Bono Region and has Banda Ahenkro as its capital town.

History

The Late President, H.E. J.E.A Mills, by an Executive Instrument (E.I) created 46 new Districts. All the inaugurated and confirmed MMDAs established are operational with immediate effect hence bringing the total number of MMDAs to 216.

The district has a population size of 45,000 as at 2010 with males being 21,000 and females being 24,000 (Source: Ghana Statistical Service  –Population Estimates for Brong Ahafo Region-2010). The current population based on the Ghana Statistical Service record is 25,123. The population has been increasing over the years with a growth rate of 2.6%.

List of settlements

Sources
 District: Banda District
 ,  Thursday, 28 June 2012.
 GhanaDistricts.com

References

 
2012 establishments in Ghana
Bono Region
Districts of Bono Region